Huxi may refer to:

 Huxi, Penghu, a rural township in Penghu County (the Pescadores), Taiwan
 Huxi, Shandong, a former prefecture in Shandong Province, China
 Huxi District, Chongqing, China